Carphina occulta is a species of longhorn beetles of the subfamily Lamiinae. It was described by Monne in 1990, and was discovered in southeastern Brazil.

References

Beetles described in 1990
Carphina